Meiacanthus is a genus of combtooth blennies found in the western Pacific and Indian oceans.  Many species in this genus make their way into the aquarium trade and several are venomous. The genus name Meiacanthus is derived from the Greek meion meaning "less" and akantha meaning "thorn" and refers to most species having relatively few dorsal fin spines.

Species
There are currently 28 recognized species in this genus:
 Meiacanthus abditus Smith-Vaniz, 1987
 Meiacanthus abruptus Smith-Vaniz & G. R. Allen, 2011
 Meiacanthus anema (Bleeker, 1852) (Threadless blenny)
 Meiacanthus atrodorsalis (Günther, 1877) (Forktail blenny)
 Meiacanthus bundoon Smith-Vaniz, 1976 (Bundoon blenny)
 Meiacanthus crinitus Smith-Vaniz, 1987
 Meiacanthus cyanopterus Smith-Vaniz & G. R. Allen, 2011
 Meiacanthus ditrema Smith-Vaniz, 1976 (One-striped poison-fang blenny)
 Meiacanthus erdmanni Smith-Vaniz & G. R. Allen, 2011
 Meiacanthus fraseri Smith-Vaniz, 1976
 Meiacanthus geminatus Smith-Vaniz, 1976
 Meiacanthus grammistes (Valenciennes, 1836) (Striped poison-fang blenny)
 Meiacanthus kamoharai Tomiyama, 1956
 Meiacanthus limbatus Smith-Vaniz, 1987
 Meiacanthus lineatus (De Vis, 1884) (Lined fangblenny)
 Meiacanthus luteus Smith-Vaniz, 1987 (Yellow fangbelly)
 Meiacanthus mossambicus J. L. B. Smith, 1959 (Mozambique fangblenny)
 Meiacanthus naevius Smith-Vaniz, 1987
 Meiacanthus nigrolineatus Smith-Vaniz, 1969 (Blackline fangblenny)
 Meiacanthus oualanensis (Günther, 1880)
 Meiacanthus phaeus Smith-Vaniz, 1976
 Meiacanthus procne Smith-Vaniz, 1976
 Meiacanthus reticulatus Smith-Vaniz, 1976
 Meiacanthus smithi Klausewitz, 1962 (Disco blenny)
 Meiacanthus tongaensis (Smith-Vaniz, 1987
 Meiacanthus urostigma Smith-Vaniz, Satapoomin & G. R. Allen, 2001
 Meiacanthus vicinus Smith-Vaniz, 1987
 Meiacanthus vittatus Smith-Vaniz, 1976 (One-striped fangblenny)

References

 
Blenniinae
Taxa named by John Roxborough Norman
Marine fish genera